The Kosovo national minifootball team represents Kosovo in international men's minifootball. It is controlled by the Kosovo Minifootball Association, the governing body for minifootball in Kosovo.

History

Early beginnings
On 25 May 2018, Kosovo Minifootball Association was founded and registered in the competent authorities by Behar Kutllovci, a former footballer and founder of M'M Liga, a Mitrovica-based minifootball league. On 12 July 2019, Kosovo applies for membership in the European Minifootball Federation. On 16 October 2020, Kosovo was accepted into European Minifootball Federation after members voted with twelve votes in favor, three abstentions and one against.

First match
On 27 March 2022, Kosovo for the first time in its history played its first international friendly match against Albania and the match ended with a 5–4 away defeat after the penalty shoot-out after the regular time of the match ended with a goalless draw, and part of the team were Artan Rrecaj (GK), Astrit Salihu, Blerim Vilanci, Enes Alushaj, Isuf Sejdiu, Krenar Kasumi, Labeat Beshiri, Nuri Damati, Valent Beqiri (GK), Veton Shabani, Visar Zogiani and the team was led by Drilon Mehmeti who was the captain and player-coach.

Fixtures and results

2022

Players

Current squad
The following players were called up for the friendly match against Albania, on 27 March 2022.

Competitive record

WMF World Cup

WMF Continental Cup

EMF miniEURO

Notes and references

Notes

References

External links
 

National minifootball teams
National sports teams of Kosovo